Pieter "Piet" Adriaan Gunning (July 5, 1913 in Hoogkerk – May 23, 1967 in Bloemendaal) was a Dutch field hockey player who competed in the 1936 Summer Olympics.

He was a member of the Dutch field hockey team, which won the bronze medal. He played all five matches as forward.

External links
 
profile

1913 births
1967 deaths
Dutch male field hockey players
Field hockey players at the 1936 Summer Olympics
Olympic bronze medalists for the Netherlands
Olympic field hockey players of the Netherlands
Olympic medalists in field hockey
Sportspeople from Groningen (city)
Medalists at the 1936 Summer Olympics
20th-century Dutch people